Götz or Goetz is a German name, in origin a hypocorism of Gottfried. It remains in use as a short form of Gottfried, but it has also become a surname.

Surnames
Goetz
 Alphonse Goetz (1865-1934), French chess master
 Arturo Goetz, Argentinian actor
 Bernhard Goetz, New York City's "subway vigilante"
 Curt Goetz, Swiss-German writer and actor
 Eric Goetz, world-renowned yacht builder
 Henri Goetz, the French-American Surrealist painter and etcher
 Hermann Goetz, German composer
 Hermann Goetz (art historian), German scholar and museum director
 James B. Goetz, American politician
 John Goetz, baseball player
 Kimi Goetz (born 1994), American speed skater
 Leo Goetz, German painter
 Louise Götz, actress
 Magdalena Żernicka-Goetz, Polish biologist
 Meg Goetz, the first woman reading clerk of the U.S. House of Representatives
 Peter Michael Goetz, actor
 Ruth Goetz, American playwright, screenwriter, and translator
 Ruth Goetz (German screenwriter), German screenwriter
 William Goetz, the American film producer

Götz
 Franz Götz (politician) (born 1945), German politician
 Leon Götz (1892–1970), New Zealand politician
 Johann Nikolaus Götz (1721–1781), German religious figure, writer and translator
 Paul Götz, German astronomer
 Rainald Götz, German writer
 Ralph Götz, president of the German Rugby Federation
 Simone Götz (born 1969), Swiss politician and oenologist

Given name

 Götz von Berlichingen (Gottfried von Berlichingen, 1480–1562), Franconian mercenary and poet
 Götz Briefs (Gottfried Anton Briefs, 1889–1974), German Catholic social ethicist, social philosopher, and political economist
 Götz Friedrich (1930–2000), German film and theater director
 Götz George (1938-2016), German actor
 Götz Aly (b. 1947), German journalist and historian
 Götz Alsmann (b. 1957), German musician and entertainer
 Götz Spielmann (b. 1961), Austrian film director
 Götz Otto (b. 1967), German actor
 Götz Werner (1944–2022), German businessman

See also
 Goetz Collection, Munich
 Goetz, Wisconsin, a small town
 Goethe (surname)
 Götz (company), a German doll manufacturer

References

German masculine given names
German-language surnames
Surnames from given names